K69IT was a low-powered television station affiliated with the Mexico-based Multimedios Television, owned and operated by Mintz Broadcasting. It broadcast on channel 69 and was licensed to Midland, Texas; the station had applied for FCC permission to move to digital channel 25 or 29.

The station's license was cancelled by the FCC on October 25, 2011.

External links

Television stations in Texas
Defunct television stations in the United States
Television channels and stations disestablished in 2011
2011 disestablishments in Texas
69IT